Adalbert (c. 985 – 26 May 1055), known as Adalbert the Victorious, was the Margrave of Austria from 1018 until his death in 1055. He was a member of the House of Babenberg.

Biography
Adalbert the Victorious was the third son of Leopold the Illustrious and Richardis of Sualafeldgau. He succeeded as Margrave upon the death of his older brother, Henry I, Margrave of Austria.

As Margrave, he extended the eastern border of the then small Ostmark of Bavaria as far as the rivers Morava/March and Leitha and supported King Henry III in his battles against Hungary and Bohemia. He resided in the Lower Austrian Babenberg castle of Melk, where Melk Abbey was to develop later.

Marriage and family
Adalbert married first Glismod of West-Saxony. They had no known children.
 
He married second Frozza Orseolo, who later took the name of Adelheid. She was the sister of Peter Urseolo of Hungary. Frozza was the mother of:

Ernest, Margrave of Austria

Death
Adalbert died on 26 May 1055 at Melk.

See also
 List of rulers of Austria

References
Citations

Bibliography

External links

 Adalbert der Siegreiche english at austria-forum.org

Year of birth unknown
980s births
1055 deaths
11th-century margraves of Austria
People from Melk